Veronica Sophia Rossman (née Veronica Sophia Parkansky, born 1972) is a Russian-born American jurist serving as a United States circuit judge of the United States Court of Appeals for the Tenth Circuit.

Early life and education 

Rossman was born Veronica Parkansky in Moscow, Soviet Union. When she was a child, her parents immigrated to the United States as political and religious refugees. She received her Bachelor of Arts from Columbia University in 1993 and her Juris Doctor from University of California, Hastings College of the Law in 1997. She is Jewish.

Career 

Rossman began her legal career as a law clerk for Chief Justice A. William Maupin on the Nevada Supreme Court from 1997 to 1998. From 1998 to 2002, she was a litigation associate at Morrison & Foerster in their Denver office. In 2003 she was an assistant federal public defender for the Districts of Colorado and Wyoming. From 2004 to 2005, she was an attorney with the law firm of Mastbaum and Moffat in Boulder, Colorado. From 2007 to 2008, she was a staff attorney for the United States Court of Appeals for the Ninth Circuit and from 2008 to 2010 was a visiting professor at the University of Denver, Sturm College of Law. From 2015 to 2017 she served as appellate division chief within the Office of the Federal Public Defender for the Districts of Colorado and Wyoming and from 2010 to 2015 she served as an assistant federal public defender in the appellate division of the same office. From 2017 to 2021, she served as senior counsel to the office.

Federal judicial service 

On May 12, 2021, President Joe Biden nominated Rossman to serve as a United States circuit judge for the United States Court of Appeals for the Tenth Circuit to the seat vacated by Judge Carlos F. Lucero, who assumed senior status on February 1, 2021. On June 9, 2021, a hearing on her nomination was held before the Senate Judiciary Committee. On July 15, 2021, her nomination was reported out of committee by a 12–10 vote. On September 14, 2021, the United States Senate invoked cloture on her nomination by a 51–44 vote. On September 20, 2021, her nomination was confirmed by a 50–42 vote. She received judicial commission on September 28, 2021. She is the only judge with experience as a federal defender serving on the United States Court of Appeals for the Tenth Circuit.

References

External links 

1972 births
Living people
20th-century American women lawyers
20th-century American lawyers
21st-century American judges
21st-century American lawyers
21st-century American women lawyers
21st-century American women judges
California lawyers
Colorado lawyers
Columbia University alumni
Jewish American attorneys
Judges of the United States Court of Appeals for the Tenth Circuit
People associated with Morrison & Foerster
Public defenders
Soviet emigrants to the United States
United States court of appeals judges appointed by Joe Biden
University of California, Hastings College of the Law alumni
University of Colorado faculty